Shree may refer to:

 Sri, an honorific commonly used in the Indian subcontinent
 Shree (Hindustani raga), the Hindustani classical music scale
 Shree (Carnatic raga), the Carnatic music scale
 Sri (Odissi raga), the Odissi classical music scale
 Shree (2002 film), a Tamil film starring Suriya, Shruthika, and Gayatri Jayaraman
 Shree (2013 film), a Hindi film starring Hussain Kuwajerwala, Paresh Ganatra and Anjali Patil
 Shree (TV series), a Hindi supernatural soap opera 
 Shri, another name for the Hindu Goddess Lakshmi

People 

Shree Bose, an American scientist, winner of the inaugural Google Science Fair

See also

 Sri (disambiguation)